Antonio De Crescentiis ( 8 May 1968 Pratola Peligna) is an Italian politician, former President of the Province of L'Aquila.

Biography 
In September 1984, he was admitted as a cadet of the class 1984-1987 "Grifo" of the prestigious Nunziatella Military School of Napoli, having as peers Valerio Gildoni and Ferdinando Scala and here he obtained the scientific high school diploma in June 1987.

On October 2, 2000 he started working for the Local Sanitary Unit of Avezzano-Sulmona, in the administration section. He graduated in Law on December 14, 2004 at the Università degli Studi di Perugia.

Politics 
From May 28, 2007 to June 12, 2017 he was mayor of the city of Pratola Peligna, and a member of the Consiglio delle Autonomie Locali d'Abruzzo.

On May 3, 2015 he was elected as President of the Provincia dell'Aquila with the 61% of votes and he maintained this office up to June 12, 2017.

Notes

External links 

  Wikimedia Commons contiene immagini o altri file su Antonio De Crescentiis

Mayors of places in Abruzzo
Presidents of the Province of L'Aquila
1968 births
Living people